Australia is renowned as one of the world's premier surfing destinations. Surfing underpins an important part of the Australian coastal fabric. It forms part of a lifestyle in which millions participate and which millions more have an interest. Australian surfboard-makers have driven innovation in surfboard design and production since the mid-1960s. The country has launched corporate giants such as Billabong, Rip Curl and Quiksilver.

No surfing is possible in many parts of northern Australia due to coral reefs subduing waves. Modern surfboard design has been shaped by both Australian and Californian developments.  For many years the sport was closely associated with the surf life saving movement in Australia.

Governing body
Surfing Australia is the national sporting body which guides and promotes the development of surfing.

Tournaments
Major Australian tournaments include the Men's Samsung Galaxy Championship Tour, Quiksilver Pro Gold Coast (Gold Coast, Queensland), Rip Curl Pro Bells Beach (Bells Beach, Victoria) and the Drug Aware Margaret River Pro (Margaret River, Western Australia). Other tournaments include the Australian Boardriders Battle, Australian Open of Surfing, Beachley Classic, Breaka Burleigh Pro and the Noosa Festival of Surfing.

History

Surfing was brought to Australia in 1915 by Hawaiian Duke Kahanamoku. He demonstrated this ancient Hawaiian board riding technique at Freshwater (or Harbord) in Sydney, New South Wales. Kahanamoku's board is now on display in the northeast end of the Freshwater Surf lifesaving club, Sydney, Australia.

In 1956, a team of lifeguards from the US introduced Malibu boards to Australia.

In the 1960s, Australian surfboard designer Bob McTavish invented the V-bottom surfboard, which is considered instrumental to the development of shortboard surfing.

Australia has produced multiple ASP world champions, such as Wayne Bartholomew, Tom Carroll, Barton Lynch, Damien Hardman, Mark Occhilupo, Mick Fanning, Joel Parkinson, Stephanie Gilmore, Layne Beachley, Wendy Botha, Pauline Menczer, Chelsea Georgeson, Sally Fitzgibbons and Mark Richards.

The World Surf League incorporates three major championship titles held in Australia: the Quiksilver Pro Gold Coast, Rip Curl Pro Bells Beach, and the Drug Aware Margaret River Pro.

One of the most successful Australian surfers, Mick Fanning, has won four titles at Bells Beach, earning him the number one spot in the surfing ranks.

Culture 

The culture of surfing has grown dramatically from just being a relaxed way of living to a mainstream sport. The progression has led to research on the health benefits of surfing. The sport promotes cardiovascular fitness, muscular strength and balance. These physical benefits come from the constant paddling through the water, increasing arm and back strength whilst also increasing the heart rate. Surfing also gives one a chance to think and relax in an environment that decreases stress and relaxes the muscles.

Demographics
There are approximately 2.5 million recreational surfers in Australia, 420,000 annual surf participants, 107 surf schools and 2,292 accredited surfing coaches. Over 1 in 10 Australians surf as a recreational activity.

Australian World Title holders 

Men

 1977: Peter Townend
 1978: Wayne Bartholomew
 1979: Mark Richards
 1980: Mark Richards 
 1981: Mark Richards
 1982: Mark Richards 
 1983: Tom Carroll
 1984: Tom Carroll
 1987: Damien Hardman
 1988: Barton Lynch
 1991: Damien Hardman
 1999: Mark Occhilupo
 2007: Mick Fanning
 2009: Mick Fanning 
 2012: Joel Parkinson
 2013: Mick Fanning

Women

 1989: Wendy Botha
 1990: Pam Burridge
 1991: Wendy Botha
 1992: Wendy Botha 
 1993: Pauline Menczer
 1998: Layne Beachley
 1999: Layne Beachley 
 2000: Layne Beachley
 2001: Layne Beachley
 2002: Layne Beachley
 2003: Layne Beachley
 2005: Chelsea Georgeson
 2006: Layne Beachley
 2007: Stephanie Gilmore
 2008: Stephanie Gilmore
 2009: Stephanie Gilmore
 2010: Stephanie Gilmore
 2012: Stephanie Gilmore
 2014: Stephanie Gilmore
 2016: Tyler Wright
 2017: Tyler Wright
 2018: Stephanie Gilmore

Australian surfboard shapers 
Australia is a leading country in surfing and surf board design. Shaping is an important part of the innovation and progression of surfing. Australian shapers include Darren Handley who is shaper to world champions Mick Fanning and Stephanie Gilmore. Mark Richards (four times World Champion) is an Australian surfing and surfboard shaping legend who shaped his own boards during his time on the world tour.

See also

Australian National Surfing Museum
Women's surfing in Australia
Scott Dillon

References

External links

 
Wikipedia articles in need of updating from March 2013